The 2021 North Queensland Cowboys season was the 27th in the club's history. Coached by Todd Payten and captained by Jason Taumalolo, they competed in the NRL's 2021 Telstra Premiership. 

The 2021 season was the Cowboys' first under Payten, who joined the club from the New Zealand Warriors on a three-year deal. He became the club's eighth full-time head coach and their 10th overall. On 16 December 2020, Taumalolo was named as co-captain of the club alongside Morgan.

The club endured another disappointing season in 2021, missing the finals for the fourth consecutive year.

Season summary
On 9 April , co-captain Michael Morgan announced his immediate retirement from rugby league due to an ongoing shoulder injury.

Milestones
 Round 1: Corey Jensen played his 50th NRL game for the club.
 Round 2: Lachlan Burr made his debut for the club.
 Round 4: Coen Hess played his 100th NRL game for the club.
 Round 5: Ben Condon scored his first NRL try.
 Round 5: Lachlan Burr scored his first try for the club.
 Round 5: The club won at Leichhardt Oval for the first time since Round 12, 2000.
 Round 7: Jake Granville played his 150th NRL game.
 Round 10: Jason Taumalolo played his 200th game for the club.
 Round 11: Heilum Luki made his NRL debut.
 Round 11: Heilum Luki scored his first NRL try.
 Round 11: Valentine Holmes scored his 500th career point.
 Round 14: Tom Dearden made his debut for the club.
 Round 15: Tom Dearden scored his first try for the club.
 Round 19: Kane Bradley made his NRL debut.
 Round 19: Kane Bradley scored his first try for the club.
 Round 19: Kyle Feldt scored his 100th try for the club.
 Round 22: Jeremiah Nanai and Griffin Neame made their NRL debuts.
 Round 22: Jeremiah Nanai scored his first NRL try.
 Round 23: Laitia Moceidreke made his NRL debut.
 Round 23: Laitia Moceidreke scored his first NRL try.
 Round 24: Scott Drinkwater played his 50th NRL game.
 Round 25: Scott Drinkwater played his 50th game for the club.

Squad

Squad movement

Gains

Losses

Re-signings

Ladder

Fixtures

Pre-season
On 13 February, the Cowboys played the Townsville Blackhawks in an unofficial hour-long scrimmage match in Ayr.

Regular season

Statistics

Representatives
The following players have played a representative match in 2021.

Honours

Club
Paul Bowman Medal: Coen Hess
Players' Player: Murray Taulagi
The Cowboys Way Award: Jake Granville
Member's Player of the Year: Jake Granville
Club Person of the Year: Ben Hampton
Rookie of the Year: Heilum Luki

Feeder Clubs

Queensland Cup
 Mackay Cutters - 12th, missed finals
 Northern Pride - 9th, missed finals
 Townsville Blackhawks - 7th, lost elimination final

Women's team

QRL Women's Premiership
 North Queensland Gold Stars - 3rd, lost semi final

References

North Queensland Cowboys seasons
North Queensland Cowboys season